Woodway is a city in McLennan County, Texas, United States. The population was 9,383 at the 2020 census. It is part of the Waco Metropolitan Statistical Area.

Geography

Woodway is located at  (31.503066, –97.223812).

According to the United States Census Bureau, the city has a total area of 6.6 square miles (17.1 km), all of it land.

Demographics

As of the 2020 United States census, there were 9,383 people, 3,177 households, and 2,602 families residing in the city.

As of the census of 2000, there were 8,733 people, 3,382 households, and 2,759 families residing in the city. Of this population 49.38% were male and 50.62% were female. The population density was 1,324.1 people per square mile (510.9/km). There were 3,481 housing units at an average density of 527.8 per square mile (203.6/km). The racial makeup of the city was 93.71% White, 2.23% African American, 0.21% Native American, 1.87% Asian, 0.05% Pacific Islander, 1.11% from other races, and 0.82% from two or more races. Hispanic or Latino of any race were 3.78% of the population.

There were 3,382 households, out of which 31.9% had children under the age of 18 living with them, 75.1% were married couples living together, 5.1% had a female householder with no husband present, and 18.4% were non-families. 16.1% of all households were made up of individuals, and 7.0% had someone living alone who was 65 years of age or older. The average household size was 2.58 and the average family size was 2.88.

In the city, the population was spread out, with 23.9% under the age of 18, 5.8% from 18 to 24, 21.3% from 25 to 44, 33.5% from 45 to 64, and 15.6% who were 65 years of age or older. The median age was 44 years. For every 100 females, there were 97.5 males.

The median income for a household in the city was $70,139, and the median income for a family was $80,161. Males had a median income of $57,363 versus $30,822 for females. The per capita income for the city was $36,306. About 2.6% of families and 2.8% of the population were below the poverty line, including 2.7% of those under age 18 and 2.9% of those age 65 or over.

Education
The city of Woodway is served by both the Midway Independent School District.and the Waco Independent School District.

History
Originally founded in 1865 by Confederate veteran Burl Kendrick, Woodway was named by a committee of citizens in the early 1950s. Following the Supreme Court decisions Brown v. Board of Education and Brown II, the city of Waco mounted an attempt to desegregate the public school system. In response to the integration attempts, residents incorporated on June 20, 1955, under the name "Woodway," a portmanteau of the area's existing place names, Woodland West and the Village of Midway.

Points of interest
The Carleen Bright Arboretum is an arboretum with gardens located at 9001 Bosque Boulevard in Woodway. It is open daily without fee. The arboretum is named in honor of Carleen Bright, long time Mayor of Woodway. The site contains  of gardens, an amphitheater with covered gazebo, a small chapel, and a rental facility. Cardinals, the official bird of Woodway, are sometimes seen in the arboretum.

References

External links

Cities in McLennan County, Texas
Cities in Texas